Donghai railway station is a railway station located in Fangliao Township, Pingtung County, Taiwan. It is located on the Pingtung line and is operated by the Taiwan Railways Administration.

References

1953 establishments in Taiwan
Railway stations opened in 1953
Railway stations in Pingtung County
Railway stations served by Taiwan Railways Administration